Robert Lukas (born 5 January  1988) is a Polish racing driver. He currently races in the Porsche Supercup series.

Racing record

Career summary

* Season still in progress.

Complete Porsche Supercup results
(key) (Races in bold indicate pole position) (Races in italics indicate fastest lap)

† Driver  did not finish the race, but was classified as he completed over 90% of the race distance.

References

External links
  
 

1988 births
Living people
Polish racing drivers
Porsche Supercup drivers
ADAC GT Masters drivers
Place of birth missing (living people)
24H Series drivers
Porsche Carrera Cup Germany drivers